Miguel Lahera Betancourt (born January 24, 1985) is a Cuban baseball player who is currently a free agent. He was part of the Cuba national baseball team that brought home a silver medal from the 2008 Summer Olympics, and also competed for the Cuba national baseball team in the 2008 Haarlem Baseball Week, 2009 World Port Tournament, 2009 World Baseball Classic, 2011 Pan American Games and 2017 World Baseball Classic.

References

External links

1985 births
Living people
2009 World Baseball Classic players
2017 World Baseball Classic players
Olympic baseball players of Cuba
Baseball players at the 2008 Summer Olympics
Baseball players at the 2011 Pan American Games
Olympic silver medalists for Cuba
Olympic medalists in baseball
Medalists at the 2008 Summer Olympics
Pan American Games bronze medalists for Cuba
Pan American Games medalists in baseball
Cazadores de Artemisa players
Vaqueros de la Habana players
Tigres de Ciego de Avila players
Alazanes de Granma players
Trois-Rivières Aigles players
Medalists at the 2011 Pan American Games
People from Artemisa
21st-century Cuban people